Free Energy was an American rock band based out of Philadelphia,  Pennsylvania. The members included Scott Wells, Sheridan Fox, Evan Wells, and Nicholas Shuminsky.

History
The Wells brothers and Sprangers are originally from Red Wing, Minnesota, where they first started playing together in the now-defunct indie rock band Hockey Night. Shuminsky, of St. Paul's Superhopper and Malachi Constant, joined Sprangers and the Wells brothers to form the band in the Fall of 2008. Critics have compared Free Energy's sound to 1970s rock acts like Journey and The Cars. 
The band rose to national prominence in March 2010 with the critically acclaimed release of their debut album Stuck on Nothing, produced by James Murphy of LCD Soundsystem. On March 17, Rolling Stone named Free Energy one of the best new bands of 2010.<ref>[https://www.rollingstone.com/rockdaily/index.php/2010/03/17/best-new-bands-of-2010-free-energy-grace-potter-and-the-nocturnals-and-five-more/ Rollingstone]</ref> The band has also received high marks from Spin Magazine. On March 17, 2010, the band performed on the Late Show with David Letterman. The single Bang Pop was used on the Pilot episode of sitcom Raising Hope. Free Energy toured heavily with Mates of State, Titus Andronicus, Hollerado, Foreign Born and The Postelles. They opened for Weezer during their Memories tour and performed on the Weezer Cruise in January 2012.

On March 6, 2012, the band released "Electric Fever," the first single from "Love Sign." The song is heavily inspired by "You Ain't Seen Nothing Yet" by Bachman-Turner Overdrive.

On January 15, 2013, Free Energy self-released its second full-length studio album, "Love Sign." The album was recorded with producer John Agnello.

Free Energy's final performance was at Clockenclap Festival in Hong Kong, 2013.

Band members
Scott Wells – lead guitar (2008–2016)
Paul Sprangers – vocals (2008–2016)
Evan Wells – bass (2008–2016)
Jesse Sparhawk – rhythm guitar (2011)
Nicholas Shuminsky – drums (2008–2016)
Geoff Bucknum – rhythm guitar (2008–2011)
Sheridan Fox – rhythm guitar (2011–2016)
Patrick Stickles - rhythm guitar (2011)

Discography

 Albums 
 Stuck on Nothing (2010) - US Heatseekers #38
 Love Sign (2013) - US Heatseekers #13

EPs
 Free Energy (EP)|Free Energy'' (2009)

Singles
 "Bang Pop" (2010)
 "Electric Fever" (2012)

Notes

External links
 Official website 
 Official Facebook

Musical groups from Philadelphia